Vernon Caryle Holloway Sr. (September 15, 1919 – January 15, 2000) was a Florida businessman and politician.

Biography
He was born in Richmond, Virginia. He founded Interstate Electric Company, Inc. (1949) in Dade County, Florida. He served eight years in the Florida House of Representatives and six years in the Florida Senate representing the 39th District in Miami. Senator Holloway died on January 15, 2000, at the age of 80.

References

2000 deaths
Politicians from Richmond, Virginia
Members of the Florida House of Representatives
Florida state senators
1919 births
20th-century American politicians
Businesspeople from Richmond, Virginia
20th-century American businesspeople